Joanna Kanska (born 1 April 1957) is a Polish-British actress who has worked in films, television, theatre and radio. She migrated to the United Kingdom in 1984.

Career
Born in Nowy Sącz, she attended the National Film School in Łódź from 1976 to 1980.

Kanska's best known roles on television were as a Polish academic, Grete Gretowska, in the second series of the BBC's A Very Peculiar Practice (1988) (and a sequel, A Very Polish Practice in 1992), ‘’The New Statesman, as Sirkka Nieminen in Capital City (1990) and as KGB Major Nina Grishna in the BBC's mini-series Sleepers (1991). She also played the part of Greta Beaumont, a Sudeten German woman, in the first episode of Foyle's War.

Personal life
Shortly after her arrival in the UK, Kanska married Polish artist Kaz Kanski after a romance of a few weeks. They were divorced five years later, but she retained her married name (the feminine version of Kanski). She has a son named Christopher from a subsequent relationship.

Notes

External links

1959 births
Living people
English television actresses
Polish emigrants to the United Kingdom